Quercus peninsularis, common name peninsular oak, is a species of oak endemic to Baja California, Mexico. It is a shrub or small tree to 10 m, occurring in mountain valleys and canyons up to 3000 m. It is placed in section Lobatae. Leaves are 5–8 cm, flat, leathery and hairy, with pointed tips and 2-5 pairs of teeth. Flowers occur in 3 cm catkins. Fruits are 1.5 cm acorns, stemless, ovoid, with hairy cupules, maturing in a year. Mature bark is reddish; young twigs are thin and hairy.

References

peninsularis
Endemic oaks of Mexico
Trees of Baja California
Taxonomy articles created by Polbot
Plants described in 1924
Taxa named by William Trelease